Cyphosticha pyrochroma is a moth of the family Gracillariidae. It is known from Queensland and New South Wales, Australia.

References

Gracillariinae
Moths described in 1894